The Montreal Crystals (Crystal Hockey Club) were an ice hockey team based in Montreal, Quebec, Canada that existed from 1884 to 1895. One of the first established ice hockey teams, the Crystals played various challenges against other clubs in the early days of ice hockey competition. They won the Canadian championship in 1886, defeating Quebec, which withdrew due to numerous injuries in the final game. Later that year the Crystals helped to found the Amateur Hockey Association of Canada where they played the first five seasons. The club won the championship in 1887, defeating the Montreal Victorias in the last challenge of the season. The team played further challenges for the championship from 1888 to 1891. 
For the 1890 season, the club became known as the Montreal Dominions (Dominion Hockey Club). In 1891 they became known as the Montreal Crescents (Crescent Hockey Club). The team sat out the 1892 season. In 1893 they returned to the league and returned to their original name of Montreal Crystals.

In February 1895, the Crystals were purchased by the Shamrocks Amateur Athletic Association, and were merged into the dormant Montreal Shamrocks Hockey Club, who were then revived replacing the Crystals in the AHAC.

The club took their various names from the rinks they played in. The Crystal Palace Skating Rink from 1884–1889. The Dominion Rink in 1890, and the Crescent Skating Rink in 1891. When the team moved to the Victoria Skating Rink in 1893, they reverted to their original name of Montreal Crystals, since they couldn't use the Victoria's name because of the Montreal Victorias.

Junior teams

Outside of the senior club, the Montreal Crystals had two lower tier teams as well.
A junior team called the Montreal Jr Crystals (Junior Crystals Hockey Club) debuted in 1887 in the JAHAC (Junior Amateur Hockey Association of Canada) and played until 1895 (with the exceptions of the 1890 and 1892 seasons).
In 1894, an intermediate version of the Montreal Crystals played in the IAHAC (Intermediate Amateur Hockey Association of Canada). This team only played that one season.

Season-by-season record

References

Bibliography

Notes

Defunct ice hockey teams in Canada
Cry
Amateur Hockey Association of Canada teams
1885 establishments in Quebec
1895 disestablishments in Quebec
Ice hockey clubs established in 1885
Ice hockey clubs disestablished in 1895